Malik Muhammad Rustam Kayani, also known as M. R. Kayani or Justice Kayani, (18 October 1902 – 15 November 1962) was a distinguished Pakistani jurist who served as Chief Justice of West Pakistan from 1958 to 1962. He is noted for his opposition to the dictatorship of General Ayub Khan.

Life and career
He hails from the village Shahpur located near Kohat, Pakistan. He was born on 18 October 1902 to an ethnic Pashtun family in the home of Khan Bahadur Abdul Samad Khan Kayani. He passed the matriculation examination from Islamia High School Kohat and did his F.A. from Edwards college Peshawar. He earned his master's degree in English from Government College Lahore.

He started his career in civil service in Punjab, British India in 1927, and after having served for eight years on the executive side, he was transferred to the judiciary in 1938. He rose to become a judge of the Punjab High Court in 1949 and then the chief justice of the West Pakistan High Court in 1958. In 1956, he was elected president of the West Pakistan Branch of the CSP Association. In that capacity he strove to uphold the status of the Civil service of Pakistan. He was also the member of the famous Punjab Disturbances Court of Inquiry.

As a chief justice
As a judge and then chief justice, his speeches at various forums were widely covered by the national press because of the rare combination of intellect, wit, courage and integrity he personified. His characteristic brand of humour and caustic, witty remarks did not spare even presidents. The most popular speaker of the country in the last four years of his life, a collection of his speeches have appeared in the form of various books like The Whole Truth, Not the Whole Truth, Half Truth, A Judge May Laugh and Afkar-e-Pareeshan.

Kayani retired in October 1962. He was not elevated to the Supreme Court of Pakistan because of his open criticism of the military regime. The citizens of Lahore arranged a farewell reception in his honor in which he was named as Lisan-e-Pakistan (the voice of Pakistan). In his reply, Kayani said that this title was dearer to him than Nishan-e-Pakistan. Then he went on to say that his purpose in delivering such satirical speeches was to keep the morale of the people high in a period of gloom and darkness. He made the people laugh in order to release their tension.

In one of his more memorable comments he wrote:

"There are quite a few thousand men who would rather have the freedom of speech than a new suit of clothes and it is these that form a nation, not the office hunters, the licenses even the tillers of the soil and drawers of the water."

One major Pakistani English newspaper comments about him, "Mr. Kayani was gifted with a keen sense of humour. He was satirical without being sarcastic, humorous without being offensive. Frail, lean and thin, he was very gentle and genial in conversation, yet firm and unshakable in conviction."

Last visit
In November 1962 he embarked upon a visit to East Pakistan where he was invited by the Bar Associations of Dhaka, Rajshahi and Chittagong. He died on 15 November 1962 in Chittagong Circuit House. His half-written speech was lying on the table beside his bed. The collections of his English and Urdu speeches entitled Not the Whole Truth, Some More Truth and Afkar-e-Pareeshan appeared posthumously.

One of the six boarding hostels at the Cadet College, Kohat is named in his honour.

References

1902 births
1962 deaths
Pakistani judges
Pashtun people
Edwardes College alumni
Government College University, Lahore alumni
Judiciary of Pakistan